The Monterey Bay Coastal Recreation Trail (or Monterey Bay Coastal Trail for short) is a trail that runs along the coast of the Monterey Bay. It stretches for 18 miles, between Castroville, California and Pacific Grove, California, and passes several tourist attractions along the way, including Cannery Row, the Monterey Bay Aquarium, and Fisherman's Wharf.

History
Much of the Monterey Bay Coastal Recreation Trail follows the former route of the Southern Pacific Railroad, which connected Castroville to Fisherman's Wharf and Cannery Row. When the railroad was abandoned, the Monterey Peninsula Regional Park District partnered with the Coastal Conservancy, as well as the cities of Pacific Grove, Monterey, and Seaside, to create the coastal trail in 1986.

Activities

The trail supports a range of activities. The trail itself supports walking, jogging, and biking. The trail also connects to multiple beaches, and passes many local restaurants and businesses. There are also grassy areas and tables for picnics at various points along the trail. Several businesses along the trail offer bicycle, kayak, surfboard, scuba, and paddle rentals. There are plentiful scenic views of the Monterey Bay and ample opportunities for wildlife viewing.

References

Monterey Bay
Tourist attractions in Monterey, California
Hiking trails in California